Der Rebbe Elimelech is a Yiddish song written in 1927 by Moyshe Nadir and loosely based on the song Old King Cole.

Lyrics and translation

(first verse)

Yiddish

English translation

When Rabbi Elimelekh

Became happy,

(Became happy, Elimelekh)

He took off his tefillin

And he put on his glasses

And he sent for his two fiddlers.

And the fiddling fiddlers

Fiddlingly fiddled!

Oh, they fiddlingly fiddled, they did!

References

Yiddish-language songs
1927 songs